Karol Itauma is a Slovakian born, British professional boxer. As an amateur, Itauma won a gold medal at the 2018 Youth Olympics.

Amateur career

Youth Olympics result
Buenos Aires 2018
First round: Defeated Jancarmelo Nieves (Puerto Rico) 5–0
Semi-finals: Defeated Youssef Ali Karar (Egypt) 5–0
Final: Defeated Ruslan Kolesnikov (Russia) 4–1

Professional career

Early career
Itauma was born in Slovakia to a Nigerian father and Slovakian mother, and moved to Kent, England at a young age. On 10 March 2020, it was announced that Itauma had signed a contract to fight professionally under the Queensberry promotional banner. Itauma made his professional debut on 5 December 2020 against Lewis Van Poetsch. Itauma won via wide points decision after winning every round on the referees scorecard. 

Itauma’s second bout as a professional was against Ryan Hibbert on 24 April 2021. Itauma knocked his opponent down with a left hook in the opening moments of the first round. Hibbert was put on the canvas for a second time midway through the opening round after Ituama landed another left hook. Itauma was declared the winner after knocking his opponent down for a third time in first round. On 10 July 2021, Itauma fought against Tim Ventrella. In the second the round, Itauma trapped his opponent against the ropes and landed a combination of punches which put Ventrella onto the canvas. Itauma secured the win after his opponent was deemed unable to carry on following the knockdown.

On 10 September 2021, Itauma fought against Darryl Sharp. Itauma won via points decision after dominating the duration of the bout. Itauma fought against Tamas Laska on 4 December 2021. Itauma won via technical knockout after landing a heavy shot to the body of Laska during the opening round. Itauma's next bout was against Jiri Kroupa on 11 March 2022. After controlling the entirety of the fight, Itauma landed a heavy right hook followed by a flurry of unanswered punches which forced the referee to end the bout in the third round.

Itauma faced Michal Ciach on the undercard of Tyson Fury vs. Dillian Whyte on 23 April 2022. In the opening round landed a combination of punches to the head and body which knocked his opponent down. In the second round, Itauma continued to pressure Ciach and scored a second knockdown after landing a number of unanswered punches. The second knockdown resulted in the referee calling an end to the bout. On 16 July 2022, Itauma fought against Michal Gazdik. After dominating the opening three rounds, Itauma landed a barrage punches in the opening minute of the fourth round. Following this exchange, the referee called an end to the bout.

Professional boxing record

References

External links

2000 births
Living people
People from Kežmarok
Sportspeople from the Prešov Region
British male boxers
Slovak male boxers
Slovak people of Nigerian descent
English people of Nigerian descent
English people of Slovak descent
Slovak emigrants to England
Boxers at the 2018 Summer Youth Olympics
Light-heavyweight boxers
Youth Olympic gold medalists for Great Britain